State Trunk Highway 52 (often called Highway 52, STH-52 or WIS 52) is a state highway in the U.S. state of Wisconsin. It runs east–west in central and northeastern Wisconsin from Wabeno to Wausau. It is one of four state highways that also serve Antigo.

Route description
Running from west to east, Highway 52 begins at an interchange with the Wisconsin Highway 29 freeway segment near Rib Mountain. Almost immediately, Highway 52 also has an interchange with the U.S. 51 freeway, which serves as Wausau's western bypass. It then enters Wausau as Stewart Street, crossing the Wisconsin River into downtown.

In downtown Wausau, Highway 52 runs on one-way streets in a loop around the central business district; the eastbound lanes join Business U.S. 51 northbound, run around the Wausau Center shopping mall, and then back north via 6th Street. Meanwhile, the westbound lanes run along southbound Business U.S. 51 past Athletic Park, home of the Northwoods League Wausau Woodchucks baseball team, and also past the Dudley Tower, the tallest commercial building in Wisconsin outside of the Milwaukee area.

Northeast of Wausau, Highway 52 runs past Hogerty, with access to the Dells of the Eau Claire River Park, a popular recreational park and campground known for its rock formations and waterfalls; the Ice Age Trail also runs through the park.

Just past Marathon County, Highway 52 meets up with U.S. Highway 45 and joins it for the drive north to Antigo, the Langlade County seat. Highways 47 and 64 also intersect Highway 52 along this stretch. From Antigo Highway 52 zigzags northeast past Lily, where it has a junction with Highway 55 along the Wolf River. The road then enters the Nicolet National Forest and into Forest County before ending at Highway 32 just northwest of Wabeno.

Major intersections

See also

Notes

References

External links

052
Transportation in Marathon County, Wisconsin
Transportation in Shawano County, Wisconsin
Transportation in Langlade County, Wisconsin
Transportation in Forest County, Wisconsin